The 1984 Notre Dame Fighting Irish football team represented the University of Notre Dame in the 1984 college football season. The team was coached by Gerry Faust and played its home games at Notre Dame Stadium in South Bend, Indiana.

Schedule

Personnel

Season summary

vs Purdue

at Michigan State

Colorado

at Missouri

Miami (FL)

Air Force

South Carolina

    
    
    
    
    
    
    
    
    
    
    

ND: Third straight home loss (first time since 1956)

at LSU

vs Navy

Source:

Penn State

at USC

Aloha Bowl (vs SMU)

Team players drafted into the NFL

Awards and honors
Former Fighting Irish player Red Sitko was inducted into the College Football Hall of Fame

References

Notre Dame
Notre Dame Fighting Irish football seasons
Notre Dame Fighting Irish football